South Asia is home to several hundred languages, spanning the countries of Afghanistan, Bangladesh, Bhutan, India, Maldives, Nepal, Pakistan, and Sri Lanka. It is home to the third most spoken language in the world, Hindi–Urdu; and the sixth most spoken language, Bengali. The languages in the region mostly comprise Indo-Iranic and Dravidian languages, and further members of other language families like Austroasiatic, Turkic, and Tibeto-Burman languages.

South Asian English is considered the international lingua franca of the South Asian countries.

Afghanistan 

The official languages of Afghanistan are Pashto and Dari, both of which are Iranic languages. Dari, an Afghan standardized register of the Persian language, is considered the lingua franca of Afghanistan and used to write Afghan literature. Tajik is spoken by people closer to Tajikistan, although officially the language is regarded same as Dari. A few Turkic languages like Uzbek and Turkmen are also spoken near regions closer to Uzbekistan and Turkmenistan. Pashto is widely spoken by the Pashtun people, who mainly reside towards the south of Afghanistan on the Pakistani-Afghan border.

Bangladesh 

Standard Bengali based on Rarhi dialect (West Bengal, India) is the national language of Bangladesh. Majority of Bangladeshis speaks Eastern Bengali. Native languages of Bangladesh are Sylheti and Chittagonian, while some ethnic minority groups also speak Tibeto-Burman, Dravidian and Austro-Asiatic languages.

Bhutan 

Dzongkha is the national language of the Kingdom of Bhutan. Almost all the languages of Bhutan are from Tibetic family (except Nepali, an Indo-Aryan language).

India 

Most languages spoken in India belong either to the Indo-Aryan, the Dravidian (c. 24%), the Austroasiatic (Munda) (c. 1.2%), or the  Tibeto-Burman (c. 0.6%) families, with some languages of the Himalayas still unclassified.
The SIL Ethnologue lists 461 living languages for India.

Hindustani is the most widespread language of India. The Indian census takes the widest possible definition of "Hindi" as the broad variety of the Hindi languages. The native speakers of Hindi so defined account for 39% of Indians. Bengali is the second most spoken language of South Asia, found in both Bangladesh and Indian states of West Bengal, Tripura and Assam. The International Mother Language Day was created by UNESCO to commemorate the Bengali language. Other notable languages include Odia, Telugu, Punjabi, Marathi, Tamil, Urdu, Sindhi, Kannada, Pashto, Malayalam,Maithili, Meitei (Manipuri) and Konkani.

Thirteen languages account for more than 1% of Indian population each, and between themselves for over 95%; all of them are the "scheduled languages of the Constitution."

Scheduled languages spoken by less than 1% of Indians are Santali (0.64%),   Meitei (Manipuri) (0.14%),  Bodo (0.13%), Dogri (0.01%, spoken in Jammu and Kashmir). The largest language that is not "scheduled" is  Bhili (0.95%), followed by Gondi (0.27%), Tulu (0.17%) and Kurukh (0.099%)

Maldives 

Divehi is national language of Maldives, spoken by 95% of the population. Arabic being considered as religious language and English being medium of instruction for education and international purposes such as tourism.

Nepal 

Most of the languages of Nepal either fall under Indo-Aryan languages or Sino-Tibetan languages. The official language of the country is Nepali, earlier known as Gorkhali in the Kingdom of Nepal, and is the mother tongue of around half the population.Meanwhile Mutually Tangible languages like   Maithili  , Bhojpuri ,Tharu ,Bajjika , Awadhi together makes Other One third Population of Nepal .

Pakistan 

Pakistan is a linguistically diverse country it has many dozens of languages spoken as first languages. The major languages of Pakistan broadly fall under the category Indo-Iranian languages, with western regions of Pakistan (close to Iran and Afghanistan) speaking Iranic languages and eastern regions (close to India) speaking Indo-Aryan languages (with the Indus River approximately dividing the families).

Other language families in Pakistan include Dravidian (Brahui spoken in Central Balochistan), Sino-Tibetan languages such as Balti and Purgi spoken in the north-east (In Baltistan region of Pakistan), Nuristani languages such as Kamkata-vari spoken in the north-west (In chitral region of Pakistan), Language Isolate Burushaski spoken in the north (In Gilgit Division), Turkic languages are also spoken in Pakistan by kyrgyz families in the North and Uzbeks and Turkmen in Khyber Pakhtunkhwa and by Refugees from Afghanistan and China.

The national uniting medium of Pakistan is Urdu, a persianized register of the Hindustani language. The major native languages of Pakistan are Baluchi, Punjabi, Sindhi, Saraiki, Pashto, while more than 70 other languages like Shina, Balti, Gujarati, Bengali etc. are also spoken.

Sri Lanka 

Sinhala and Tamil are the official languages of Sri Lanka, with Sri Lankan English as the link language. Tamil is a South-Dravidian language, and Sinhala belongs to the Insular Indic family (along with Dhivehi of Maldives). Vedda is said to be the indigenous language of Sri Lanka before the arrival of the Indo-Aryans and Dravidians.

See also 
 Languages of Asia
 Languages of Bangladesh
 Languages of Bhutan
 Languages of India
 Languages with official status in India
 List of languages by number of native speakers in India
 Languages of Maldives
 Languages of Nepal
 Languages of Pakistan 
 Languages of Sri Lanka

References

Citations 
 
 Data table of Census of India, 2001
 SCHEDULED LANGUAGES IN DESCENDING ORDER OF SPEAKERS' STRENGTH – 2001
 COMPARATIVE RANKING OF SCHEDULED LANGUAGES IN DESCENDING ORDER OF SPEAKERS' STRENGTH-1971, 1981, 1991 AND 2001
 Census data on Languages

External links
 Major Indian Languages
 Ethnologue report
 Central Institute of Indian Languages